Skoplje '63 is a 1964 Yugoslavian documentary film directed by Veljko Bulajić about the 1963 Skopje earthquake (Skoplje, per film title, is the Serbo-Croatian spelling of Skopje). It was screened at the 1964 Cannes Film Festival, but wasn't entered into the main competition. The film was awarded the Golden Nymph award at the Monte Carlo Television Festival, and it was selected as the Yugoslav entry for the Best Foreign Language Film at the 37th Academy Awards, but it was not accepted as a nominee.

The filming started three days after the earthquake and lasted for four months. After that, Bulajić spent 12 months editing the footage at Jadran Film studios.

See also
 List of submissions to the 37th Academy Awards for Best Foreign Language Film
 List of Yugoslav submissions for the Academy Award for Best Foreign Language Film

References

External links

1964 films
1964 documentary films
1960s in Skopje
Yugoslav documentary films
Serbo-Croatian-language films
Yugoslav black-and-white films
Films directed by Veljko Bulajić
Documentary films about earthquakes
Jadran Film films
Films set in 1963
Films set in North Macedonia